The Soul of Satan is a 1917 American silent drama film directed by Otis Turner and starring Gladys Brockwell, Bertram Grassby and Charles Clary.

Cast
 Gladys Brockwell as Miriam Lee 
 Bertram Grassby as Joe Valdez 
 Charles Clary as 'Lucky' Carson 
 William Burress as Alden Lee 
 Josef Swickard as Chicago Stone 
 Gerard Alexander as Fanny Stone 
 Norbert A. Myles as Jim Calvert 
 Lucille Young as Helen Valdez 
 Frankie Lee as Miriam's Brother 
 Marie Kiernan as Miriam's Sister

References

Bibliography
 Solomon, Aubrey. The Fox Film Corporation, 1915-1935: A History and Filmography. McFarland, 2011.

External links
 

1917 films
1917 drama films
1910s English-language films
American silent feature films
Silent American drama films
American black-and-white films
Films directed by Otis Turner
Fox Film films
1910s American films